Ernesto Montagne Sánchez (August 18, 1916 – April 13, 1993) was a Peruvian politician who served as the Prime Minister of Peru from October 3, 1968, to January 31, 1973. He was born on August 18, 1916, in Lima.

References

External links 
 gw.geneanet.org

1916 births
1993 deaths
People from Lima
Peruvian people of French descent
Prime Ministers of Peru
Peruvian Ministers of Education
Peruvian generals